Paralepistopsis is a genus of fungi in the family Tricholomataceae.

Taxonomy 
The Paralepistopsis genus was created in 2012 by the Italian mycologist Alfredo Vizzini to better classify two rare toxic species formerly located in the Clitocybe genus.

Clitocybe amoenolens found in Morocco and parts of South Europe and C. acromelalga from Asia were noted to have habits more similar to Paralepista flaccida (formerly Lepista flaccida) than to other Clitocybe species. Additionally the pileipellis and microscopic details of these species were distinct from others in the Clitocybe genus and related genera. Genetic sequencing placed these species close to Cleistocybe and Catathelasma genera.

The most important distinction for mushroom hunters however is the presence of toxic acromelic acids in these species which can present dangers when foraging for similar looking edible species in these locations. Acromelic acid A is a potent neurotoxin with a chemical formula of C13H14N2O7 which is associated with causing paralysis and seizures

The type species, Paralepistopsis amoenolens was previously classified as Clitocybe amoenolens and is commonly known as the paralysis funnel due to the harmful effects caused by consuming it.

Etymology 
This genus name is in reference to its resemblance to Paralepista species.

Species 
, Index Fungorum accepted 2 species of Paralepistopsis. 

 Paralepistopsis acromelalga
 Paralepistopsis amoenolens

See also 
 Clitocybe

References 

Fungi
Tricholomataceae
Paralepistopsis
Fungi described in 2012